The Rights of Colonies Examined was an influential essay published in 1764 by Founding Father Stephen Hopkins. It received widespread circulation and brought hearty approval throughout the colonies.  Historian Thomas Bicknell called it "the most remarkable document that was issued during the period preceding the War of the Revolution." Massachusetts Governor Thomas Hutchinson wrote that "it was conceived in a higher strain than any that were sent out by other colonies."  With this paper, Hopkins became to Rhode Island what Samuel Adams was to Massachusetts and what Thomas Jefferson was to Virginia.  It was printed widely, and Hopkins became recognized as one of the leaders of public opinion in the colonies.

References

Documents of the American Revolution